The BL 6-inch Mark XII naval gun was a British 45 calibre naval gun which was mounted as primary armament on light cruisers and secondary armament on dreadnought battleships commissioned in the period 1914–1926, and remained in service on many warships until the end of World War II.

Design 

This was a high-velocity naval gun consisting of inner "A" tube, "A" tube, wound with successive layers of steel wire, with a jacket over the wire.

Naval service 

It superseded the 45-calibre Mk VII gun and the longer 50-calibre Mk XI gun which had proved unwieldy in light cruisers due to its length, and was Britain's most modern 6-inch naval gun when World War I began.

It was superseded as secondary armament on new battleships in the 1920s by the 50-calibre 6-inch Mk XXII gun, and as main armament on new light cruisers in the 1930s by the 50-calibre 6-inch Mk XXIII gun.

Guns were mounted in the following ships :
 Birmingham-class light cruisers laid down 1912, commissioned 1914
 Arethusa-class light cruisers laid down 1912, commissioned 1914
 C-class light cruisers of 1914
 M29-class monitors of 1915
 Queen Elizabeth-class battleships laid down 1912, commissioned 1915
 Revenge-class battleships laid down 1913, commissioned 1916
 Destroyer leader HMS Swift as re-gunned in 1917
 Danae-class (or D-class) light cruisers completed 1918–1919
 Monitors HMS Raglan and HMS Abercrombie from 1918
 Emerald-class (or E-class) light cruisers laid down 1918, commissioned 1926

Coast defence gun 
During WWII some Mk XII guns were used in emergency coast defense batteries.

Notable actions 
 Ordinary Seaman John Henry Carless was posthumously awarded the Victoria Cross for heroism in serving his gun on HMS Caledon during the Second Battle of Heligoland Bight on 17 November 1917.

Ammunition 
This gun generated a higher pressure in the chamber on firing compared to preceding 6-inch guns such as Mk VII and Mk XI. This necessitated use of special shells capable of withstanding a pressure of 20 tons per square inch on firing, which had "Q" suffixed to the name. World War I shells were marked "A.Q." denoting special 4 CRH shells for this gun.

See also 
 List of naval guns

Weapons of comparable role, performance and era 
 15 cm SK L/45 German equivalent

Surviving examples 
 On monitor  at Portsmouth Historic Dockyard, UK
 A gun from HMAS Adelaide at HMAS Cerberus naval base, Victoria, Australia

Notes and references

Bibliography 
 
 "Handbook for the 6-inch Breech Loading Mark XII. Gun" G.21117/17. Admiralty, Gunnery Branch, 1917.

External links 

 Tony DiGiulian, British 6"/45 (15.2 cm) BL Mark XII and Mark XX

Naval guns of the United Kingdom
World War I naval weapons of the United Kingdom
World War II naval weapons of the United Kingdom
152 mm artillery
Vickers
Coastal artillery